Catascythris is a monotypic moth genus in the family Scythrididae described by Hans Georg Amsel in 1935. Its single species, Catascythris kebirella, described by the same author, is found in Israel, Iran, Oman, Saudi Arabia and Jordan.

References

Scythrididae
Taxa named by Hans Georg Amsel
Monotypic moth genera
Moths of Asia